Tall-e Quchan may refer to:
 Tall-e Quchan, Khuzestan
 Tall-e Quchan, Kohgiluyeh and Boyer-Ahmad